Trixie from Broadway is a 1919 silent film drama directed by Roy William Neill and starring Margarita Fischer and Emory Johnson.

Plot

Cast
{| 
! style="width: 180px; text-align: left;" |  Actor
! style="width: 230px; text-align: left;" |  Role
|- style="text-align: left;"
|Margarita Fischer||Trixie Darling
|-
|Emory Johnson||John Collins
|-
|George Periolat||Broadway Benham
|-
|Frank Clark||Jim Brown
|-
|Olga Grey||Gertie Brown
|-
|J. Farrell MacDonald||Slim Hayes
|-
|}

References

External links

1919 films
American silent feature films
American black-and-white films
Films directed by Roy William Neill
1910s English-language films
1910s American films